The 1991 Australian Indoor Championships, also known by its sponsored name Uncle Toby's Australian Indoor Tennis Championships, was a men's tennis tournament played on indoor hard courts at the Sydney Entertainment Centre in Sydney in Australia and was part of the Championship Series of the 1991 ATP Tour. It was the 19th edition of the tournament and was held from 30 September through 7 October 1991. First–ranked Stefan Edberg won the singles title.

Finals

Singles

 Stefan Edberg defeated  Brad Gilbert 6–2, 6–2, 6–2
 It was Edberg's 5th title of the year and the 47th of his career.

Doubles

 Jim Grabb /  Richey Reneberg defeated  Luke Jensen /  Laurie Warder 6–4, 6–4
 It was Dyke's 1st title of the year and the 7th of his career. It was Reneberg's 1st title of the year and the 3rd of his career.

Notes

References

External links
 International Tennis Federation (ITF) – tournament edition details

 
Australian Indoor Championships
Australian Indoor Tennis Championships
Australian Indoor Championships
Australian Indoor Championships
Sports competitions in Sydney
Tennis in New South Wales